Ksshitij Chaudhary is an Indian Punjabi film director known for films such as Jatts In Golmaal, Mr & Mrs 420 and Yaara o Dildaara.

Early life and career
Ksshitij began his career with the direction of the DVD film Meri Vahuti Da viyah. In 2009 he got his first big break in the form of Harbhajan mann's "Heer-Ranjha" and then "Yaara o Dildaara" again a Habhajan mann's movie and then in 2013 he directed an out and out comedy film Jatts in Golmaal starring Arya Babbar, Gurpreet Guggi, jaswinder bhalla Binnu dhillon karamjeet anmol. In 2014 He directed romantic comedy film Mr. & Mrs. 420 starring Jassi Gill, Yuvraaj Hans, Babal rai, shruti sodhi, swati kapoor, Avantika hundal, jaswinder bhalla, binnu dhillon and with the success of his films Ksshitij Became A Successful Director of Punjabi cinema.

Filmography
 Heer Ranjha: A True Love Story  - 2009
 Yaara o Dildaara - 2011
 Jatts In Golmaal - 2013
 Mr & Mrs 420 - 2014
 Main Teri Tu Mera  2016
 Vekh Baraatan Challiyan - 2017
 Bailaras - 2017
 Golak Bugni Bank Te Batua - 2018
 Mr & Mrs 420 Returns - 2018
 Uda Aida - 2019
 Sohreyan Da Pind Aa Gaya - 2022

References

External links
 
 

1982 births
Living people
Punjabi-language film directors
Film directors from Punjab, India
Artists from Amritsar